Mădăraș or Mădăras may refer to:
Mădăras, a commune in Bihor County, Romania
Mădăraș, Harghita, a commune in Harghita County, Romania
Mădăraș, Mureș, a commune in Mureș County, Romania
Mădăras, a village in Ardud town, Satu Mare County, Romania
Mădăraș River, a tributary of the Olt River in Romania

See also
Madaras (disambiguation)
Madara (disambiguation)